U.S. Route 17 (US 17) in Florida is a north–south United States Highway. It runs  from the Punta Gorda, Florida Metropolitan Statistical Area northeast to the Greater Jacksonville Metropolitan Area.

As is the case with all Florida roads with AASHTO route numbers, the entirety of US 17 has a hidden FDOT designation:
 State Road 35 from the route's terminus at US 41 in Punta Gorda to East Main Street in Bartow.
 State Road 555 from East Main Street in Bartow to US 92/SR 600 in Lake Alfred.
 State Road 600 from Lake Alfred to DeLand along the course of the route's cosigning with US 92.
 State Road 15 from the intersection with SR 50 and US 17/US 92/SR 15 south in Orlando to the Martin Luther King Jr. Parkway interchange in Jacksonville.
 State Road 5 from the Martin Luther King Jr. Parkway interchange in Jacksonville to the Georgia state line over the St. Marys River.

Concurrencies include US 98 between Fort Meade and Bartow, and a notably long one with US 92 between Lake Alfred and northern DeLand, which itself includes concurrencies with US 192 in Kissimmee, US 441 between Kissimmee and Orlando, SR 50 in Orlando, and SR 46 in Sanford. Others include SR 20/SR 100 between San Mateo and Palatka, and Interstate 10 (I-10), I-95, US 23, and US 1 in Downtown Jacksonville in that order.

Route description

Punta Gorda through Winter Haven

US 17 begins in downtown Punta Gorda at US 41 (Tamiami Trail). From here, it proceeds east as a pair of one-way streets along Marion and Olympia Avenues. Once outside of the Punta Gorda city limits, the one-way streets rejoin each other becoming a six-lane highway.  From here, it is briefly elevated over the Seminole Gulf Railway and city streets before intersecting with Interstate 75 (I-75) at exit 164 in Solana. After a brief jog east, it travels roughly northeast along the Peace River into Desoto County, where it goes through Fort Ogden, Nocatee, and Arcadia. It splits into one-way streets again through Arcadia, where it intersects SR 70. Once out of Arcadia, it continues northeast into Hardee County. Here it returns to a four lane divided highway with a 65 mph speed limit.  It continues to the cities of Zolfo Springs (where it crosses the Peace River), and Wauchula. At Fort Meade, it joins with US 98, which follows it northward (westward on US 98) until Bartow. While US 98 goes northwest, US 17 goes northeast.

In the city of Bartow, US 17 is known as Spessard Holland Parkway.  Here, US 98 leaves to the west at a connecting road to SR 60, where hidden SR 35 breaks away from US 17 and SR 555 replaces it. From here, US 17/SR 555 makes a sharp northeast turn into Gordonville as it passes by the Bartow Municipal Airport. North of there, US 17 serves as the main road through Eagle Lake After the intersection of Crystal Beach Road, the highway divides into a one-way couplet with three lanes in each direction, with the northbound section on 5th Street and the southbound segment on 4th Street. The two segments converge again south of Cameron Road (Gilbert Road) to become a six-lane divided highway. At the next major intersection, SR 540 (Old 9 Foot Road) joins US 17 and both roads continue north in a short concurrency. At Eloise, Old 9 Foot Road moves east onto County Road 655, which is the southern terminus of SR 655 (South Lake Shipp Road) on the west side. A left turn at this intersection and a right turn onto the parallel Seventh Street Southwest takes motorists to Winter Haven Amtrak Station. US 17/SR 540 goes over the Amtrak line between Lake Shipp and Lake Lulu, both of which go over a canal running between the two lakes. The canal serves as the southern border of Winter Haven. Descending as it passes the Chain O' Lakes Sports Complex, SR 540 leaves US 17 at Cypress Gardens Boulevard to continue eastward, but this intersection is also for Southwest Avenue R, which also leads to Winter Haven Station. Between Avenue G Southwest and Avenue C Southwest, US 17 curves to the left from Third Street and then to the right onto Sixth Street. From there it intersects Central Avenue, which is SR 542 east of US 17. After winding around Spring Lake east of Lake Mirror, the road runs along the west side of Inman Park until it reaches the intersection with SR 544.

Concurrency with US 92

US 17 and US 92 join at the south end of Lake Alfred in Polk County. and thus the new hidden state road is SR 600 which carries US 92 west into Auburndale, Lakeland, Plant City, Tampa, and St. Petersburg. SR 555 soon splits off as CR 555 to the north along the old road through Lake Alfred, known as South Buena Vista Road while US 17/US 92 runs one block east on Lake Shore Way. Just south of East Thelma Street, US 17/US 92 splits onto two different roadways while CR 555 ends on the west side of the intersection. CR 557 begins at Haines Boulevard, where it heads west for a block to former CR 555, and then turns north towards I-4; just past CR 557, US 17/US 92 turns east towards Haines City. It enters downtown Haines City on Hinson Avenue after crossing under US 27 at a cloverleaf interchange, meeting the north end of SR 17. In Davenport, US 17 meets CR 547, which heads west to US 27 and north along old US 17/US 92. US 17 then intersects with Ronald Reagan Parkway (CR 54) at Loughman.

After crossing into Osceola County, US 17/US 92 picks up the Orange Blossom Trail (OBT) name. From here US 17/US 92 roughly parallels I-4 along the overlap. OBT takes US 17 east and north through Kissimmee and into Orlando. The OBT name temporarily ends at Pleasant Hill Road (former SR 531) in southern Kissimmee, where it becomes John Young Parkway (formerly Bermuda Avenue) to Vine Street (US 192/SR 530). (US 17 ran through downtown Kissimmee on Emmett Street, Broadway and Main Street until 1999) It turns east there on US 192, while John Young Parkway becomes SR 423. When all three meet US 441 at Main Street, US 192 follows US 441 southbound, while US 17/US 92 follows US 441, as well as unsigned SR 500 and SR 600, north into downtown Orlando, but not before becoming OBT again at the northern city limits.

Due to its proximity with Walt Disney World and affiliated resorts as well as Sea World, Universal Studios, and others, US 17/US 92/US 441 intersects many toll roads between Kissimmee and Orlando, the first of which is the partially tolled and partial limited-access Osceola Parkway in Kissimmee. Immediately after this in Orlando is SR 417 (Central Florida GreeneWay) at exit 11. North of here the Central Florida Parkway lead to Sea World. Neither of these intersections or interchanges however, compare to the combined interchanges of Florida's Turnpike and SR 528 (Beachline Expressway), in Sky Lake, which contains a series of convoluted parclo interchanges and partial ramps from side roads. North of this interchange, the road passes west of The Florida Mall and intersects SR 482.

The first interchange with I-4 is at exit 80 in Holden Heights. Eastbound access from I-4 comes from partial cloverleaf ramps, and westbound access comes from a left-turn ramp between the two carriageways that runs under the eastbound lane and merges with the east to southbound ramp before merging with southbound OBT. The interchange provides no south to east access and no west to north access, but such access can found from the intersection with West Michigan Street. Further north the road heads into Orlando and comes to the interchange with SR 408 (East-West Tollway) at exit 9, which is a diamond interchange. After curving around Givens Street and Springdale Road, both of which can only be accessed from West Concord Street, OBT moves closer to a parallel railroad freight line and meets the intersection of SR 50 (Colonial Drive) northwest of downtown. At SR 50, US 17/US 92 turns east onto a new concurrency taking hidden SR 600 with it, while US 441 continues northwest on OBT towards Apopka. US 17/US 92/SR 50 meets the south end of Edgewater Drive and crosses under I-4 at a second interchange (exits 83A east and exit 84 west) and SR 527 (Orange Avenue southbound and Magnolia Avenue northbound) before meeting SR 15 (Mills Avenue), where US 17/US 92 turns north. Mills Avenue carries SR 15 on both sides of SR 50, but is only signed as such to the south, as north of SR 50, it carries US 17/US 92 (and unsigned SR 600). It crosses Lake Estelle on the Andrews Causeway before reaching the border between Orlando and Winter Park.

In Seminole County, the redevelopment of the 17-92 Community Redevelopment Area is handled by the US 17-92 Community Redevelopment Agency, a component unit of the County government. In Sanford, Florida, US 17/US 92 shares a concurrency with westbound SR 46 beginning at Paola Road (CR 46A) and 25th Street. During this triple-concurrency, US 17/US 92/SR 46 intersects an at-grade railroad crossing with a freight line at the intersection of West 13th Street, also the western terminus of CR 415, and then a pair of railroad crossings at a junction of two other freight lines. The routes turn left at the intersection of First Street, and the wrong way concurrency between US 92 and SR 46 becomes more geographically accurate. Along this segment, US 17/92/SR 46 climbs a bridge over the CSX Sanford Subdivision which includes the Sanford Amtrak Auto Train on the southeast corner of that bridge, and the Sanford SunRail station on the northwest corner. SR 46 leaves US 17/US 92 at the intersection of Sanford CR 15 (Upsala Road), while SR 46 continues west towards Mount Dora and US 17/US 92 continues north along Monroe Road. Just before the intersection with Orange Boulevard, and an at-grade crossing with the Sanford Subdivision, US 17/92 curves to the northeast as it approaches part of the  interchange with I-4. Still within the vicinity of this interchange the road turns left onto West Seminole Boulevard only to curve north where it crosses the St. Johns River into Volusia County via the Benedict Bridge, which replaced the Lake Monroe Bridge, running parallel to the very interstate it had just passed under.

DeLand and points north

In the City of DeLand US 17/US 92 adopts the name Woodland Boulevard. At Howry Avenue, the road becomes the eastern border of the National Register of Historic Places-listed Downtown DeLand Historic District. Two blocks later, it intersects SR 44, which does not allow any turns — right or left — and so adjacent city streets are marked for those turns. Another two blocks north of this point, US 17/US 92 leaves the historic district at Rich Avenue, but then at Ohio Avenue enters another historic district for Stetson University. Further north US 92 then splits away from US 17, with US 92 continuing east to Daytona Beach as International Speedway Boulevard, while US 17 continues north. That straight north directive ends at the intersection of SR 11, and US 17 curves to the northwest, where it serves as the termini of both State Road 15A and its county extension County Road 15A. Within DeLeon Springs, the road runs straight north again and serves as the southern terminus of County Road 3, a scenic detour off of US 17. Curving northwest again before the intersection of Spring Garden Ranch Road, US 17 approaches the vicinity of DeLeon Springs State Park and begins to run parallel to CR 3 again, which it continues to do beyond the preserve, even as it enters Barberville and intersects SR 40. CR 3 finally terminates with US 17 in Connersville. Momentarily curving east in Satsuma, the road crosses one creek before entering San Mateo where it begins at yet another concurrency, in this case with SR 20/SR 100. All three roads enter Palatka, and after the intersection with SR 207, US 17 again crosses the St. Johns River, along with SR 20/SR 100 on the Palatka Memorial Bridge. From here, SR 20 breaks away onto South 9th Street and heads west towards Gainesville and the Florida Panhandle, and then US 17/SR 100 pass by the historic Palatka Amtrak station, originally known as the Old Atlantic Coast Line Union Depot, which now serves as the Palatka Railroad Preservation Society and the Browning Railroad Museum, where it encounters a grade crossing. After US 17 curves northwest, SR 100 breaks away onto Reid Street heading towards Lake City, while US 17 takes a turn to the direct north. The last major intersection in Palatka is with the northern terminus of SR 19. North of here, the road follows the CSX "A" Line, the same one used by Amtrak that serves Palatka station. The road follows that line until it reaches Bostwick, where it runs along CR 209, while US 17 shifts to the northwest.

In Clay County, US 17 continues its rural surroundings until it enters suburban Jacksonville. South of Green Cove Springs it goes over the same Amtrak line it ran parallel to between Palatka and Bostwick and becomes the northern terminus of CR 209, only to later intersect with eastbound SR 16, where it forms a concurrency and becomes Orange Avenue. Most of this segment runs through preserved wetlands with no structures whatsoever, except for a local Elks Lodge until it reaches Oak Street. SR 16 turns west at Ferris Street while US 17 continues north along part of the Green Cove Springs Historic District, then past various Clay County government buildings. After this, it crosses over the Governors Creek Bridge where it continues its status as a commercial strip, although the commercialization diminishes somewhat after Shedd Road. After passing by the entrance of Camp Chowenwaw Park US 17 crosses Black Creek and enters Hibernia, where it encounters Black Creek Park on the other side of the creek and runs parallel to the Black Creek Rail Trail. The road then enters Fleming Island, Florida where it serves as the eastern terminus of County Road 220 (Doctor's Inlet Road), which is also the intersection of Bald Eagle Road. Black Creek Trail ends on the bridge over Doctor's Inlet, but US 17 continues to move north into Orange Park, Florida, where the road is known as Park Avenue. Besides serving as the eastern terminus of SR 224, it also serves as the location of the Orange Park Kennel Club, just south of the interchange with I-295 which itself serves as the border between Orange Park and Jacksonville, where the road becomes Roosevelt Boulevard.  Here, the highway goes past Jacksonville Naval Air Station (NAS Jax). Near downtown Jacksonville, US 17 joins I-10 for approximately one mile (1.6 km), before merging into I-95. US 17 then exits onto US 23 and continues as North Main Street along with US 1 until it reaches the Martin Luther King Jr. Parkway then continues on its own through Northside Jacksonville where it crosses the Trout River only to pass through less urban surroundings before it crosses the Nassau County border.

In Nassau County, US 17 enters Hedges and then Yulee where it intersects SR 200/SR A1A. US 17 turns northwest and continues into Becker where it intersects CR 108 to the west, then a truck weigh station on the east side and finally as it enters the former turpentine making village of Gross, encounters the last interchange with I-95 in the state, a partial cloverleaf interchange on both the northwest and northeast corners of the I-95 bridge over both the road and the CSX Kingsland Subdivision. More than a mile after an abandoned motel, as well as a gas station and truck repair shop, US 17 later curves north at a Florida Agricultural Inspection Station and reaches the Georgia border, crossing over the St. Marys River.

History

US 17 was one of the original routes of the U.S. Highway system, which was established in 1926.  It initially terminated in Jacksonville, but was extended south through Orlando to Punta Gorda in 1932.

From 1956, signs for U.S. Highways in Florida had different colors for each highway. The "shield" for US 17 was yellow, until the state was forced by the federal government to conform to standards that required consistent black-and-white signs in 1993.

In 1980, US 17 was realigned and elevated slightly at the southern end in Punta Gorda to accommodate the construction of Interstate 75, which also included splitting the route into the current one-way pairs along Marion Street and Olympia Avenue.  The route formerly continued along Marion Avenue to Florida Street and Dundee Road.  Since then, US 17 has been incrementally widened to a divided highway with four or more lanes through Charlotte, Desoto, and Hardee Counties.  Much of the widening has incorporated a parallel abandoned Florida Southern/Atlantic Coast Line Railroad corridor between Bowling Green and Arcadia, which was removed in the early 1980s.  Today, the northbound one-way segment through Wauchula runs along this former rail corridor as well as the southbound one-way segment through Arcadia.  In 2006, a short segment was realigned to the east along this rail corridor just north of Arcadia, bypassing Brownville.  The former alignment is now known as Cubitis Avenue.  Another segment through Zolfo Springs was realigned to the former railroad corridor in early 2018.  Main Street in Zolfo Springs is the previous alignment of this segment of US 17.

In 1994, the original Lake Monroe Bridge over the St. Johns River near Sanford, which was built in 1933 along with this segment of US 17, was replaced with the current four-lane Bill Benedict Bridge.  The swing span of the original bridge has been preserved and now serves as a pier next to the current bridge.

On August 13, 2004, Hurricane Charley made landfall just before 4:00 p.m. local time near the southern terminus of US 17. Incredibly, Charley would either hit or threaten to hit the entire route of US 17, devastating almost the entire route in Florida, at least from Punta Gorda to well north of Orlando (when Charley followed the route of Interstate 4 out to sea). The Georgia stretch of US 17 was not hit, but was under a hurricane warning. When Charley made landfall again in South Carolina, its trail all the way through Virginia was close to the route of US 17.

In late 2013, the Florida Department of Transportation began an $80 million project to construct a flyover interchange with US 17-92 traveling over SR 436 in Casselberry. This interchange was built to alleviate congestion at one of the busiest intersections in Florida. The flyover interchange was completed on April 6, 2015, with a ribbon-cutting ceremony held.

Future
US 17 is currently being widened from the Hardee/Desoto County Line to Sweetwater Road in southern Hardee County, which will be completed in summer of 2018.  Upon completion of this project, US 17 will be at least four lanes continuously from the terminus in Punta Gorda to Haines City.

Major intersections

|-
|colspan=6|see US 441 (mile 229.899-247.086)

See also

References

External links

US 17 in Florida (SouthEastRoads.com)

 Florida
17
17
17
17
17
17
17
17
17
17
17
17
17
17
17